Madison Junior-Senior High School may refer to:

Madison Junior-Senior High School in Middletown, Ohio
James Madison Junior-Senior High School in Houston, Texas, now known as Madison High School